James Stevenson (1877 – 3 July 1916) was a Scottish professional footballer who played in the Football League for Derby County, Newcastle United, Grimsby Town and Leicester Fosse as an inside forward. He also played in the Scottish League for Clyde.

Personal life 
After the outbreak of the First World War, Stevenson enlisted as a private in the Highland Light Infantry in Glasgow and was posted to the Western Front in November 1915. On 3 July 1916, he was killed in a failed attack on the Leipzig Salient, during the early stages of the Battle of the Somme. Stevenson is commemorated on the Thiepval Memorial.

Career statistics

References

1877 births
1916 deaths
Footballers from Paisley, Renfrewshire
Scottish footballers
English Football League players
Association football inside forwards
British Army personnel of World War I
Highland Light Infantry soldiers
British military personnel killed in the Battle of the Somme
Scottish Football League players
Ashfield F.C. players
Clyde F.C. players
Derby County F.C. players
Southern Football League players
Newcastle United F.C. players
Bristol City F.C. players
Grimsby Town F.C. players
Leicester City F.C. players
St Mirren F.C. players
Military personnel from Paisley, Renfrewshire
Scottish Junior Football Association players
FA Cup Final players